Japan competed at the 2000 Summer Olympics in Sydney, Australia. 266 competitors, 156 men and 110 women, took part in 156 events in 28 sports.

Medalists

| width=78% align=left valign=top |

| width=22% align=left valign=top |

Archery

Sayoko Kawauchi was the most successful Japanese archer in Sydney, advancing to the quarterfinal before being defeated by eventual silver medallist Kim Nam-Soon.

Men's team competition:
Makiyama, Matsushita, Hamano – Round of 16, 14th place (0-1)

Athletics

Men's competition
Men's 100 m
Shingo Kawabata
 Round 1 – 10.39
 Round 2 – 10.6 (did not advance)
Koji Ito
 Round 1 – 10.45
 Round 2 – 10.25
 Semifinal – 10.39 (did not advance)
Shigeyuki Kojima
 Round 1 – 10.59 (did not advance)

Men's 200 m
Shingo Suetsugu
 Round 1 – 20.6
 Round 2 – 20.37
 Semifinal – 20.69 (did not advance)
Koji Ito
 Round 1 – 20.75
 Round 2 – 20.56
 Semifinal – 20.67 (did not advance)

Men's 400 m
Jun Osakada
 Round 1 – 45.88
 Round 2 – 46.15 (did not advance)
Takahiko Yamamura
 Round 1 – 46.25 (did not advance) 
Kenji Tabata
 Round 1 – 46.59 (did not advance)

Men's 5,000 m
Toshinari Takaoka
 Round 1 – 13:29.99
 Final – 13:46.90 (15th place) 
Katsuhiko Hanada
 Round 1 – 13:41.31 (did not advance)

Men's 10,000 m
Toshinari Takaoka
 Round 1 – 27:59.95
 Final – 27:40.44 (7th place) 
Katsuhiko Hanada
 Round 1 – 27:45.13
 Final – 28:08.11 (15th place)

Men's 110 m Hurdles
Satoru Tanigawa
 Round 1 – 13.74
 Round 2 – 13.94 (did not advance)

Men's 400 m Hurdles
Kazuhiko Yamazaki
 Round 1 – 50.15 (did not advance) 
Hideaki Kawamura
 Round 1 – 50.68 (did not advance) 
Dai Tamesue
 Round 1 – 01:01.81 (did not advance)

Men's 4 × 100 m
Nobuharu Asahara, Koji Ito, Shingo Kawabata, Shigeyuki Kojima, Shingo Suetsugu
 Round 1 – 38.52
 Semifinal – 38.31
 Final – 38.66 (6th place)

Men's 4 × 400 m
Shunji Karube, Jun Osakada, Kenji Tabata, Takahiko Tamamura
 Round 1 – 03:05.21
 Semifinal – 03:13.63 (did not advance)

Men's Hammer Throw
Koji Murofushi
 Qualifying – 78.49
 Final – 76.60 (9th place)

Men's Long Jump
Masaki Morinaga
 Qualifying – 7.84 (did not advance)
Daisuke Watanabe
 Qualifying – NM (did not advance)

Men's Triple Jump
Takamori Sugibayashi
 Qualifying – 16.67 (did not advance)

Men's High Jump
Takahisa Yoshida
 Qualifying – 2.15 (did not advance)

Men's Pole Vault
Manabu Yokoyama
 Qualifying – 5.55 (did not advance)

Men's 20 km Walk
Satoshi Yanagisawa
 Final – 1:25:03 (22nd place) 
Daisuke Ikeshima
 Final – 1:25:34 (27th place)

Men's 50 km Walk
Fumio Imamura
 Final – 4:13:28 (36th place) 
Akihiko Koike
 Final – DQ

Men's marathon
Shinji Kawashima
 Final – 2:17:21 (21st place) 
Nobuyuki Sato
 Final – 2:20:52 (41st place) 
Takayuki Inubushi
 Final – DNF

Women's competition
Women's 5,000 m
Yoshiko Ichikawa
 Round 1 – 15:23.41 (did not advance) 
Megumi Tanaka
 Round 1 – 15:39.83 (did not advance) 
Michiko Shimizu
 Round 1 – 15:48.20 (did not advance)

Women's 10,000 m
Harumi Hiroyama
 Round 1 – 32:07.68
 Final – 32:24.17 (20th place) 
Chiemi Takahashi
 Round 1 – 32:34.70
 Final – 31:52.59 (15th place) 
Yuko Kawakami
 Round 1 – 32:36.60
 Final – 31:27.44 (10th place)

Women's 100 m Hurdles
Yvonne Kanazawa
 Round 1 – 13.13
 Round 2 – 13.11
 Semifinal – 13.16 (did not advance)

Women's 800 m Wheelchair
Wakako Tsuchida
 Final – 01:56.49 (silver medal)

Women's High Jump
Yoko Ota
 Qualifying – 1.94
 Final – 1.90 (11th place) 
Miki Imai
 Qualifying – 1.92 (did not advance)

Women's Marathon
Naoko Takahashi
 Final – 2:23:14 (gold medal)
Eri Yamaguchi
 Final – 2:27:03 (7th place) 
Ari Ichihashi
 Final – 2:30:34 (15th place)

Badminton

Men's singles
Hidetaka Yamada
 Round of 64: Bye 
 Round of 32: Lost to Taufik Hidayat of Indonesia
Keita Masuda
 Round of 64: Bye 
 Round of 32: Lost to Xia Xuanze of China

Women's singles
Kanako Yonekura
 Round of 64: Defeated Tatiana Vattier of France
 Round of 32: Defeated Anu Weckstrom of Finland
 Round of 16: Lost to Dai Yun of China
Yasuko Mizui
 Round of 64: Bye 
 Round of 32: Defeated Marina Yakusheva of Russia
 Round of 16: Defeated Julia Mann of Great Britain
 Quarterfinal: Lost to Gong Zhichao of China
Takako Ida
 Round of 64: Bye 
 Round of 32: Lost to Mette Sorensen of Denmark

Women's doubles
Haruko Matsuda, Yoshiko Iwata
 Round of 32: Defeated Amrita Sawaram, Marie-Helene Valerie Pierre of Mauritius
 Round of 16: Lost to Qin Yiyuan, Gao Ling of China
Satomi Igawa, Hiroko Nagamine
 Round of 32: Lost to Irina Rousliakova, Marina Yakusheva of Russia

Baseball

Men's Team Competition
Japan, which had won a bronze medal in the first Olympic baseball tournament and a silver medal in the second, once again made the semifinals in the third. The Japanese team defeated the Netherlands, Italy, Australia, and Africa but lost to the three teams that finished at the top of the group: the United States, Korea, and Cuba. In the semifinals, Japan played Cuba for the second time in as many games, losing again to the two-time gold medallists. Playing for the bronze medal against Korea, the Japanese team was again defeated.

Preliminary Round (4-3)
 Lost to United States 2-4
 Defeated Netherlands 10-2
 Defeated Australia 7-3
 Defeated Italy 6-1
 Defeated South Africa 8-0
 Lost to Korea 6-7
 Lost to Cuba 2-6
Semifinals
 Lost to Cuba 0-3
Bronze-medal match
 Lost to Korea 1-3
Team Roster

So Taguchi
Fumihiro Suzuki
Nobuhiko Matsunaka
Jun Haima
Norihiro Nakamura
Yukio Tanaka
Yoshinori Okihara
Osamu Nogami
Yoshihiko Kajiyama
Yoshikazu Doi
Masato Kawano
Shunsuke Watanabe
Yuji Yoshimi
Masanori Ishikawa

Akichika Yamada
Toshiya Sugiuchi
Daisuke Matsuzaka
Masanori Sugiura
Shinnosuke Abe
Kosuke Noda
Tomohiro Iizuka
Jun Hirose
Norihiro Akahoshi
Tomohiro Kuroki
Manager: Kozo Ohtagaki    
Coach: Hiroyuki Hayashi    
Coach: Keiichi Nagasaki    
Coach: Osamu Nomura

Beach volleyball

Boxing

Men's Bantamweight (– 54 kg)
Kazumasa Tsujimoto
Round 1 – Defeated Hassan Oucheikh of Morocco
Round 2 – Lost to Guillermo Rigondeaux of Cuba (did not advance)

Men's Featherweight (– 57 kg)
Hidehiko Tsukamoto
Round 1 – Lost to Yosvani Aguilera of Cuba (did not advance)

Canoeing

Flatwater

Women's competition
Women's Kayak Singles 500 m
Sayuri Maruyama
 Qualifying Heat – 02:00.833 (did not advance)

Slalom

Men's competition
Men's Kayak Singles
Taro Ando
 Qualifying – 442.64 (did not advance)

Cycling

Cross Country Mountain Bike
Men's Cross Country Mountain Bike
Raita Suzuki
 Final – Lapped (34th place)

Women's Mountain Bike
Hiroko Nambu
 Final – 2:06:13.88 (26th place)

Road Cycling
Men's Road Race
Yoshiyuki Abe
 Final – DNF

Women's Road Race
Miho Oki
 Final – 3:12:40 (40th place)

Track Cycling

Men's competition
Men's Sprint
Shinichi Ota
Qualifying – 10.603
Repechage – 2nd place – Heat 2
First round – Lost to Viesturs Berzins of Latvia
Tomohiro Nagatsuka
Qualifying – 10.595
Repechage – 3rd place – Heat 1
First round – Lost to Pavel Buráň of Czech Republic

Men's 1 km Time Trial
Narihiro Inamura
Final – 01:05.085 (9th place)

Men's Point Race
Makoto Iljima
Points – 6
Laps Down – 2 (16th place)

Men's Keirin
Shinichi Ota
First round – Heat – 1; Place – 3
Repechage – Heat – 1; Place – 2
Second round – Heat – 2; Place – 6 (did not advance)
Yuichiro Kamiyama
First round – Heat – 3; Place – 6
Repechage – Heat – 3; DNF (did not advance)

Men's Olympic Sprint
Narihiro Inamura, Yuichiro Kamiyama, Tomohiro Nagatsuka
Qualifying – 45.406
Second round – 45.264 (did not advance)

Women's competition
Women's Point Race
Akemi Morimoto
Points – 0 (16th place)

Diving

Men's 3 Metre Springboard
Ken Terauchi
 Preliminary – 389.88
 Semi-final – 226.89 – 616.77
 Final – 407.58 – 634.47 (8th place)

Men's 10 Metre Platform
Ken Terauchi
 Preliminary – 457.59
 Semi-final – 191.49 – 649.08
 Final – 445.41 – 636.90 (5th place)

Equestrianism

Fencing

Four fencers, two men and two women, represented Japan in 2000.

Men's foil
 Naoto Okazaki

Men's sabre
 Masashi Nagara

Women's foil
 Yuko Arai
 Miwako Shimada

Football

Men's Team Competition
Team Roster

 ( 1.) Seigo Narazaki
 ( 2.) Yuji Nakazawa
 ( 3.) Naoki Matsuda
 ( 4.) Ryuzo Morioka
 ( 5.) Tsuneyasu Miyamoto
 ( 6.) Junichi Inamoto
 ( 7.) Hidetoshi Nakata
 ( 8.) Tomakazu Myojin
 ( 9.) Tomoyuki Hirase
 (10.) Shunsuke Nakamura
 (11.) Atsuhiro Miura
 (12.) Tomoyuki Sakai
 (13.) Atsushi Yanagisawa
 (14.) Masashi Motoyama
 (15.) Norihiro Nishi
 (16.) Kōji Nakata
 (17.) Naohiro Takahara
 (18.) Ryota Tsuzuki
 (19.) Kota Yoshihara
 (20.) Satoshi Yamaguchi
 (21.) Yasuhito Endō
 (22.) Hitoshi Sogahata

Group D

Quarter-finals

Gymnastics

Judo

Modern pentathlon

Rhythmic gymnastics

Rowing

Sailing

Five men and four women competed in six different Sailing events at the 2000 Olympics, including two top 10 finishes.

Men's Double Handed Dinghy (470)
Eiichiro Hamazaki and Yuji Miyai
 Race 1 – 19 
 Race 2 – (22)
 Race 3 – (26)
 Race 4 – 13 
 Race 5 – 4 
 Race 6 – 16 
 Race 7 – 17 
 Race 8 – 18 
 Race 9 – 10 
 Race 10 – 16 
 Race 11 – 20 
 Final – 133 (18th place)

Women's Mistral
Masako Imai
 Race 1 – 6 
 Race 2 – 12 
 Race 3 – 10 
 Race 4 – 10 
 Race 5 – (15)
 Race 6 – 5 
 Race 7 – 9 
 Race 8 – 11 
 Race 9 – (16)
 Race 10 – 7 
 Race 11 – 8 
 Final – 78 (10th place)

Women's Single Handed Dinghy (Europe)
Maiko Sato
 Race 1 – 21 
 Race 2 – 13 
 Race 3 – 20 
 Race 4 – 22 
 Race 5 – 22 
 Race 6 – 17 
 Race 7 – 22 
 Race 8 – (24)
 Race 9 – 22 
 Race 10 – (23)
 Race 11 – 13 
 Final – 172 (23rd place)

Women's Double Handed Dinghy (470)
Yumiko Shige and Yurie Alicia Kinoshita
 Race 1 – 9 
 Race 2 – 5 
 Race 3 – 10 
 Race 4 – 7 
 Race 5 – 1 
 Race 6 – (14)
 Race 7 – 8 
 Race 8 – 3 
 Race 9 – (12)
 Race 10 – 12 
 Race 11 – 11 
 Final – 66 (8th place)

Open Laser
Kunio Suzuki
 Race 1 – (38)
 Race 2 – 12 
 Race 3 – 19 
 Race 4 – 15 
 Race 5 – 32 
 Race 6 – (36)
 Race 7 – 17 
 Race 8 – 25 
 Race 9 – 24 
 Race 10 – 30 
 Race 11 – 28 
 Final – 202 (27th place)

Open High Performance Two Handed Dinghy (49er)
Kenji Nakamura and Tomoyuki Sasaki
 Race 1 – 4 
 Race 2 – 4 
 Race 3 – 10 
 Race 4 – 15 
 Race 5 – 9 
 Race 6 – 16 
 Race 7 – (17)
 Race 8 – 15 
 Race 9 – 15 
 Race 10 – 13 
 Race 11 – 16 
 Race 12 – (17)
 Race 13 – 14 
 Race 14 – 16 
 Race 15 – 14 
 Race 16 – 12 
 Final – 173 (16th place)

Shooting

Softball

Women's Team Competition
Preliminary Round Robin
Defeated Cuba (4:1)
Defeated PR China (3:1)
Defeated United States (2:1)
Defeated Australia (1:0)
Defeated Canada (4:3)
Defeated Italy (2:0)
Defeated New Zealand (2:1)
Semifinals
Defeated Australia (1:0)
Final
Lost to United States (1:2) →  Silver Medal

Team Roster
Misako Ando
Yumiko Fujii
Taeko Ishikawa
Kazue Ito
Yoshimi Kobayashi
Shiori Koseki
Mariko Masubuchi
Naomi Matsumoto
Emi Naito
Haruka Saito
Juri Takayama
Hiroko Tamoto
Reika Utsugi
Miyo Yamada
Noriko Yamaji

Swimming

Men's 400 m Freestyle
Masato Hirano
 Preliminary Heat – 03:51.41 (did not advance)

Men's 1500 m Freestyle
Masato Hirano
 Preliminary Heat – 15:14.43 (did not advance) 
Yota Arase
 Preliminary Heat – 15:18.20 (did not advance)

Men's 100 m Butterfly
Takashi Yamamoto
 Preliminary Heat – 52.91
 Semi-final – 53.01
 Final – 52.58 (5th place)

Men's 200 m Butterfly
Takashi Yamamoto
 Preliminary Heat – 01:58.07
 Semi-final – 01:57.66 (did not advance)
Hisayoshi Tanaka
 Preliminary Heat – 01:59.00
 Semi-final – 01:58.06 (did not advance)

Men's 100 m Breaststroke
Kosuke Kitajima
 Preliminary Heat – 01:01.68
 Semi-final – 01:01.31
 Final – 01:01.00 (4th place) 
Akira Hayashi
 Preliminary Heat – 01:02.86 (did not advance)

Men's 200 m Breaststroke
Akira Hayashi
 Preliminary Heat – 02:15.54
 Semi-final – 02:15.16 (did not advance)
Kosuke Kitajima
 Preliminary Heat – 02:15.71 (did not advance)

Men's 200 m Individual Medley
Susumu Tabuchi
 Preliminary Heat – 02:05.68 (did not advance)

Men's 400 m Individual Medley
Shinya Taniguchi
 Preliminary Heat – 04:17.36 (did not advance) 
 Final – 04:20.93 (8th place) 
Susumu Tabuchi
 Preliminary Heat – 04:20.76 (did not advance)

Women's 50 m Freestyle
Sumika Minamoto
 Preliminary Heat – 25.52
 Semi-final – 25.43
 Final – 25.65 (8th place)

Women's 100 m Freestyle
Sumika Minamoto
 Preliminary Heat – 55.8
 Semi-final – 55.62
 Final – 55.53 (7th place)

Women's 400 m Freestyle
Sachiko Yamada
 Preliminary Heat – 04:12.45 (did not advance) 
Yasuko Tajima
 Preliminary Heat – 04:14.23 (did not advance)

Women's 800 m Freestyle
Sachiko Yamada
 Preliminary Heat – 08:33.06
 Final – 08:37.39 (8th place)

Women's 100 m Butterfly
Junko Onishi
 Preliminary Heat – 59.11
 Semi-final – 59.04
 Final – 59.13 (6th place) 
Maki Mita
 Preliminary Heat – 01:00.97 (did not advance)

Women's 200 m Butterfly
Maki Mita
 Preliminary Heat – 02:09.85
 Semi-final – 02:09.88
 Final – 02:09.66 (7th place) 
Yuko Nakanishi
 Preliminary Heat – 02:10.22
 Semi-final – 02:09.89
 Final – 02:10.72 (8th place)

Women's 100 m Breaststroke
Masami Tanaka
 Preliminary Heat – 01:09.12
 Semi-final – 01:09.04
 Final – 01:08.37 (6th place) 
Junko Isoda
 Preliminary Heat – DNS (did not advance)

Women's 200 m Breaststroke
Masami Tanaka
 Preliminary Heat – 02:27.39
 Semi-final – 02:26.24
 Final – 02:26.98 (7th place) 
Junko Isoda
 Preliminary Heat – 02:29.60
 Semi-final – 02:31.71 (did not advance)

Women's 100 m Backstroke
Mai Nakamura
 Preliminary Heat – 01:00.88
 Semi-final – 01:01.07
 Final – 01:00.55 (silver medal)
Noriko Inada
 Preliminary Heat – 01:02.19
 Semi-final – 01:01.25
 Final – 01:01.14 (5th place)

Women's 200 m Backstroke
Miki Nakao
 Preliminary Heat – 02:11.69
 Semi-final – 02:12.49
 Final – 02:11.05 (bronze medal)
Tomoko Hagiwara
 Preliminary Heat – 02:12.15
 Semi-final – 02:11.02
 Final – 02:11.21 (4th place)

Women's 200 m Individual Medley
Tomoko Hagiwara
 Preliminary Heat – 02:15.16
 Semi-final – 02:15.09
 Final – 02:15.64 (8th place) 
Yasuko Tajima
 Preliminary Heat – 02:21.65 (did not advance)

Women's 400 m Individual Medley
Yasuko Tajima
 Preliminary Heat – 04:40.35 (did not advance) 
 Final – 04:35.96 (silver medal)

Women's 4 × 100 m Medley
Sumika Minamoto, Mai Nakamura, Junko Onishi, Masami Tanaka
 Preliminary Heat – 04:05.76
 Final – 04:04.16 (bronze medal)

Synchronized swimming

Japan won two silver medals in the synchronized swimming competition at the 2000 Olympics.

Team
Ayano Egami, Raika Fujii, Yoko Isoda, Rei Jimbo, Miya Tachibana, Miho Takeda, Yuko Yoneda, Yoko Yoneda, Juri Tatsumi
 Technical Routine – 34.51
 Free Routine – 64.35
 Final – 98.86 (silver medal)

Duet
Miya Tachibana, Miho Takeda
 Technical Routine – 34.3
 Free Routine – 64.35
 Final – 98.65 (silver medal)

Table tennis

Taekwondo

Tennis

Trampolining

Triathlon

Women's Individual Competition:
Kiyomi Niwata – 2:03:53.01 (14th place)
Akiko Hirao – 2:04:18.70 (17th place)
Haruna Hosoya – DNF

Men's Individual Competition:
Takumi Obara – 1:50:29.95 (21st place)
Hideo Fukui – 1:52:04.79 (36th place)
Hiroyuki Nishiuchi – 1:56:59.76 (46th place)

Weightlifting

Men

Wrestling

Notes

Wallechinsky, David (2004). The Complete Book of the Summer Olympics (Athens 2004 Edition). Toronto, Canada. . 
International Olympic Committee (2001). The Results. Retrieved 12 November 2005.
Sydney Organising Committee for the Olympic Games (2001). Official Report of the XXVII Olympiad Volume 1: Preparing for the Games. Retrieved 20 November 2005.
Sydney Organising Committee for the Olympic Games (2001). Official Report of the XXVII Olympiad Volume 2: Celebrating the Games. Retrieved 20 November 2005.
Sydney Organising Committee for the Olympic Games (2001). The Results. Retrieved 20 November 2005.
International Olympic Committee Web Site

References

Nations at the 2000 Summer Olympics
2000
Summer Olympics